Rodrigo Rivero Fernández (born 27 December 1995) is a Uruguayan footballer who plays as a winger for Club Libertad.

References

External links

Rodrigo Rivero at Eurosports
Rodrigo Rivero at Football Database

1995 births
Living people
Uruguayan footballers
Uruguayan expatriate footballers
Montevideo Wanderers F.C. players
Club Libertad footballers
Uruguayan Primera División players
Paraguayan Primera División players
Association football midfielders
Uruguayan expatriate sportspeople in Paraguay
Expatriate footballers in Paraguay